The Perry Hodgden House, at 104 W. Main St. in Ellsworth, Kansas, was listed on the National Register of Historic Places in 1973.

It was one of the first stone houses in Ellsworth County, Kansas.

Perry Hodgden arrived in Ellsworth in 1867, and helped built the community.  He operated a dry-goods store, he served as postmaster for a period, and he was treasurer of the Ellsworth Town Company.  He operated or invested in a livery stable, he was active in the city council, and he organized the County Agricultural Society.  In 1871 he bought the lot, and then in subsequent years bought more lots adjacent, and after frame buildings were destroyed in Ellsworth in 1874 and 1876 fires he proceeded with stone construction.

The house was deemed "of local historic importance to the Ellsworth community because of the contributions of Perry Hodgden to the growth and development of the community."

The house is now part of a museum of the Ellsworth County Historical Society, named the Hodgden House Museum Complex, which also includes displays in a large historic stone stable.  The society also operates the Fort Harker Guardhouse Museum Complex in Kanopolis, Kansas.

References

External links

National Register of Historic Places in Ellsworth County, Kansas
Buildings and structures completed in 1877
Stone houses in the United States
Museums in Ellsworth County, Kansas